Beyond Scared Straight is a reality television series that aired on A&E from 2011 to 2015. The series follows troubled teenagers who spend one to three days in prison to learn from the inmates about the realities of being incarcerated. The series was inspired by the 1978 American documentary Scared Straight!.   

In June 2015, the network announced the series will end after season 9 which concluded September 3, 2015.

Summary 
Based on 1978 American documentary Scared Straight!, profile juvenile crime prevention programs in prisons across the United States. In each hourlong episode follows a handful of at-risk teenagers. The troubled teens get bullied and harassed by both the police and the prisoners in every episode. Each episode begins with an interview of each teen discussing why they are always getting in trouble. Afterward, they meet up and enter the facility to go through the booking process. They must remove jewelry, their belts, hats and sunglasses if they wear them, and relinquish other personal possessions. In some episodes, the teens wear the jumpsuits. They go to the cell blocks and see the reality behind bars. They interact with the inmates. Next, they eat the prison meal. Then, they are put inside a cell. They meet up with the prisoners, telling their stories of how they ended up in jail. The teens will then interact with their parents through the prison visitor telephone. Finally, when they leave, they get a second chance where get a follow-up a month later. The episode ends with the latest update. Some changed their ways while some didn't.

Episodes

Season 1

Season 2

Season 3

Season 4

Season 5

Season 6

Season 7

Season 8

Season 9

Controversy

Criticism 
Two Department Of Justice officials argued that the program was “not only ineffective but is potentially harmful." The program helps teens by scaring them straight through a lousy concept. The series has been criticized due to the teens being in jail for adults which were considered life threatening and dangerous, and that the show violated the federal Juvenile Justice & Delinquency Prevention Act (JJDPA).

Related shows
 The World's Strictest Parents
 The Principal's Office
 Teen Trouble
 Sleeping with the Family
 Scared Straight!

References 

2010s American reality television series
2011 American television series debuts
2015 American television series endings
A&E (TV network) original programming
English-language television shows
Television series about teenagers